These are the results of the 1971 Central American and Caribbean Championships in Athletics which took place on July 14–17, 1971 in Kingston, Jamaica.

Men's results

100 meters
Final

200 meters

Heats – July 15

Final – July 16

400 meters
Final

800 meters

1500 meters

5000 meters

10,000 meters

Half marathon

110 meters hurdles
Final – July 16

400 meters hurdles
Final

3000 meters steeplechase

4 x 100 meters relay

4 x 400 meters relay

10,000 meters walk

High jump

Pole vault

Long jump

Triple jump

Shot put

Discus throw

Hammer throw

Javelin throw

Decathlon

Women's results

100 meters
Final

200 meters
Final

400 meters

800 meters

1500 meters

200 meters hurdles

4 x 100 meters relay

4 x 400 meters relay

High jump

Long jump

Shot put

Discus throw

Javelin throw

Pentathlon

References

Central American and Caribbean Championships
Events at the Central American and Caribbean Championships in Athletics